Men of the Desert is a 1917 American silent Western film directed by W.S. Van Dyke and starring Jack Gardner, Ruth King and Carl Stockdale.

Cast
 Jack Gardner as Jack
 Ruth King as May
 Carl Stockdale as Mason

References

Bibliography
 Singer, Michael. Film Directors: A Complete Guide, Volume 9. Lone Eagle Publishing, 1992.

External links
 

1917 films
1917 Western (genre) films
1910s English-language films
American black-and-white films
Films directed by W. S. Van Dyke
Essanay Studios films
Silent American Western (genre) films
1910s American films